The University of Somalia (UNISO) is a private university in Mogadishu, Somalia.

Overview
The institution was founded in 2005 by a group of independent scholars. It is headquartered in downtown Mogadishu, and also has a branch in El-sha Biyaha.

As of 2014, the university provides higher instruction to a student body of 6,000 pupils. It is a co-educational institution.

Colleges
University of Somalia has six colleges:

College of Health Science
College of Business administration
College of Engineering and Computer
College of Education and Social Science
College of Sharea and Law
College of agroveterinary science

Medical
Facilities operated by the university include:

Networking labs
Programming labs
Medical labs
Libraries
Teaching hospitals
Printing services
Internet

Postgraduate
It has also Postgraduate Department which provides the following programs
Master of Business Administration (MBA)
Master of Leadership and governance
Master of Computer Systems
Master of Public Health
Master of Anatomy
Master of Physiology
Master of Pathology

Notes

Universities in Somalia
2005 establishments in Somalia
Educational institutions established in 2005
Universities in Mogadishu